General Mirza Aslam Beg  (born 2 August 1931), also known as M. A. Beg, was a Pakistan Army officer, who served as the 3rd Chief of Army Staff from 1988 until his retirement in 1991. His appointment as chief of army staff came when his predecessor, President General Zia-ul-Haq, died in an air crash on 17 August 1988.

Beg's tenure witnessed Benazir Bhutto as being elected Prime Minister in November 1988, and the restoration of democracy and the civilian control of the military in the country. Controversial accusations were leveled against him of financing the Islamic Democracy Alliance (IDA), the conservative and right-wing opposition alliance against left-wing PPP, and rigging subsequent general elections in 1990. As a result of general elections, Nawaz Sharif was elected Prime Minister in 1990, but fell out with Beg when the latter recommended support for Iraq during the Gulf War. Beg was denied an extension from President Ghulam Ishaq Khan soon after in 1991, and replaced by General Asif Nawaz as chief of army staff. Apart from his military career, Beg briefly tenured as professor of security studies at the National Defence University (NDU) and regularly writes columns in The Nation.

Beg's post-retirement has been characterized by controversies: first, Beg was accused of playing an internal role in the airplane crash that killed President Zia, and, second, he was summoned to the Supreme Court of Pakistan in 2012 for his alleged role in releasing the financial funding to the conservative politicians as opposed to the Pakistan Peoples Party's politicians during the general elections held in 1990.

Biography

Early life in India and education

Mirza Aslam Baig was born in the small village, Muslimpatti, in Azamgarh district, Uttar Pradesh in British India, to the Urdu-speaking Muhajir family that was well known for its Mughal nobility, on 2 August 1931.

His father, Mirza Murtaza Baig, was an advocate and practicing lawyer who had held a well known prestige and respected name in the law circles of the Allahabad High Court. The Baig's family had traced a long ancestral roots of the Mughal Royal family who once were emperors of India from the early 15th century to the early 18th century.

He was educated at the Azamgarh where he graduated from a local high school and enrolled at the Shibli National College for his undergraduate studies, in 1945. Subsequently, he earned Bachelor of Arts (BA) degree in Liberal Arts from Shibli National College in 1949.

During his college years, Mirza played collegiate field hockey and was vital member of his hockey team which consisted mainly Muslims. According to his memories, Beg sought revenge on a Hindu politician belonging to Congress Party after the politician had beaten up a member of his hockey team. Egged on by a mob of students, Beg used his hockey stick to beat up the politician at a public meeting. This incident came after his graduation from college in 1949, and Beg's family decided to move to Pakistan in 1949 after the Indian partition in 1947.

Career in the military

The Beg family set sailed for Karachi from Bombay via Royal Pakistan Navy ship in 1949. His elder brother was already a commissioned officer in the Pakistan Army and encouraged young Beg to follow his path to seek a career in the army. Beg recalled his memoirs to his Indian interviewer and called Pakistan as "my dream country". In 1950, Beg was accepted at the Pakistan Military Academy (PMA) in Kakul, graduating from a class of 6th PMA Long Course in 1952.

In 1952, he gained a commission as 2Lt. in the 6 Baloch Regiment of the Pakistan Army and initially assisting the command of an infantry platoon. From 1952 to 1958, he progressed well towards the military ranks, having been promoted to army lieutenant in 1956; and army captain in 1958. He received recommendations from his field commanding officer for the selection by the special branch to join the special forces, and departed to the United States in 1958 to complete the special forces training with the U.S. Army Special Forces in Fort Bragg, North Carolina.

In 1960, Major Beg returned to Pakistan, and joined the elite Army Special Service Group (SSG), initially commanding a company that specialized in military infiltration. Major Beg was deployed in Western Pakistan, in areas adjacent to Afghanistan, where his first combat experience took place when he led his company in removing the Nawab of Dir in Chitral in North-West Frontier Province. In 1965, Major Beg served well in the second war with India and led the Special Forces team against the Indian Army.

Academia and professorship

In 1967, Major Beg was promoted as Lieutenant-Colonel, eventually sent to attend the National Defence University (NDU) to continue his higher education, alongside then-Lieutenant-Colonel Zahid Ali Akbar, an engineering officer from the Corps of Engineers.

After attending the Armed Forces War College and graduated with MSc in Strategic studies in 1971, Lt.Col. Beg was stationed in East-Pakistan to serve as a military adviser to the Eastern Command led by its GOC-in-C, Lieutenant-General A.A.K. Niazi. Upon arriving and observing the military deployments and actions, Lt.Col. Beg became very critical of Gen. Niazi's strategy and eventually became involved in acrimonious argument with his Gen. Niazi's staff in Dacca, having been very critical of armed forces interference in the political events in East. His open mindedness and arguments with his senior officer eventually led his transfer back to Pakistan and was threatened with facing the court martial.

In 1971, he commanded an infantry regiment in third war with India but was sent back to attend the National Defence University where he became even more involved with his studies. In 1971–72, he earned his MSc in War Studies, defending and publishing his thesis, entitled: "A journey of pain and fear" which provide critical analysis of state sponsored terrorism and its effects on geo-military positions of the countries. Lt. Col. Beg left the special forces, and accepted the professorship on war studies at the NDU in 1975. Brig. Beg tenured as the professor on the war studies and remained Chief Instructor of Armed Forces War College at the then National Defence University until January 1978.

About the 1971 war, Beg maintained that the Pakistan Armed Forces "learned a valuable strategic lesson", and that quoted that the government also learned that "there is no point in going to war unless you are absolutely certain you have the capability to win".

From 1994 to 1999, Beg continued his teaching at NDU and published his two books on national security, nuclear weapons development, defence diplomacy and international relations.

War and Command appointments

In 1978, Brig. Beg left the professorship at the university and was promoted into the two-star command appointment in the army. Major-General Beg was appointed as the GOC of the 14th Army Division, stationed at the Okara Military District of Punjab Province in Pakistan.

In March 1979, chief of army staff, General Zia-ul-Haq, directed the II Strike Corps' "to ascertain the likely reaction of the Pakistan Armed Forces officers if Bhutto was hanged", in accordance to the Supreme Court's verdict. During this meeting, Major-General Beg objected to the hanging of Bhutto and maintained to his senior commanders that: "The hanging of Bhutto would be an unwise act, as it could cause very serious "political aberrations" that will be difficult to correct. In 1979, Major-General Beg was moved at Army GHQ, taking over the staff appointment as an Adjutant-General, which he served until 1980. He was later elevated as the Chief of General Staff (CGS), remained in charge of operational planning of the counter-offensive to the Indian invasion of Siachen marking the beginnings of the ongoing Siachen conflict in 1984.

In 1985, Major-General Beg was elevated to three-star promotion and was appointed as Corp's Commander of the XI Corps, that stationed in Peshawar, which had role in the indirect war with the Soviet Army in Afghanistan, since 1980.

According to the military authors and Pakistani historians' accounts, Lieutenant-General Beg was extremely distrusted by President Zia-ul-Haq, mainly due to his open-mindedness and his pro-democracy views, at one point, advising President Zia to "rendezvous with the nation's history and democratize the country."

In 1987, Lieutenant-General Beg was in the race for the promotion of four-star appointment, along with Lieutenant-General Zahid Ali Akbar, but was overlooked by President Zia who wanted to Lt.Gen. Akbar for the four-star appointment as chief of army staff. Prime Minister M.K. Junejo eventually used his prerogative to appoint Lieutenant-General Mirza Aslam Beg as vice-army chief on merit, despite President Zia wanting Lieutenant-General Zahid Ali Akbar who was sent to DESTO.

Chief of Army Staff

In March 1987, Prime Minister Mohammad Junejo announced in the news media of appointing Lieutenant-General Beg as a Vice Chief of Army Staff, promoting him as the four-star rank general in the army.

Though, General Beg did not supersede anyone and was the most senior, the promotion was notable due to the opposition shown by President Zia-ul-Haq who wanted Lieutenant-General Zahid Ali Akbar, an engineer, as vice army chief.

Despite his four-star command assignment, General Beg had to report his duties and decisions to President Zia who had been army chief since 1976. Eventually, General Beg succeeded President Zia as the new army chief and the command of the army when the latter died in an accidental plane crash on 17 August 1988. American military authors regarded Beg as "mild but bookish general" keen to drive the country towards the tracks of democracy.

The United States military regarded Beg as an "Unpredictable General" could not be counted on to continue close military cooperation with the United States as Zia did in the 1980s. The Pentagon had commented on Beg as "a professional soldier" with no political ambitions, but independent-minded and unpredictable. In 1988, one Pentagon military official added that "Beg is hard to figure out and difficult to read his mindset unlike other Pakistan army generals, he hasn't been particularly friendly with the US."

Against the popular perception to take over, Beg endorsed Ghulam Ishaq Khan as president and ultimately called for new general elections which resulted in a peaceful democratic transfer of government to the Pakistan Peoples Party (PPP) with Benazir Bhutto as the Prime minister. Beg did not consult any of his corps commanders or principal staff officers (PSOs) and called on the Chief of Naval Staff, Admiral Iftikhar Sirohey, and Chief of Air Staff Air Chief Marshal Hakimullah, to discuss the matter briefly and within three hours of General Zia-ul-Haq's death, restored the Constitution and handed over power to Ghulam Ishaq Khan. It was an unprecedented decision in favour of democracy and the rule of law.

Mirza Aslam Beg was endorsed by Prime Minister Benazir Bhutto who confirmed his four-star appointment as chief of army staff until 1991, when he was replaced by General Asif Nawaz. Unlike General Zia, Beg initiated a massive re-evaluation and education training program for the inter-services officers. In 1988, Beg's personal initiatives led to sending of hundreds of inter-services officers to Western universities for advanced degrees. By 1991, several of the inter-services officers had gained post-graduate degree in operational and technical training.

In 1988, Prime Minister Benazir Bhutto conferred Beg with a specially designated civil award for Mirza Aslam Beg for restoring democracy in Pakistan, Tamgha-e-Jamhuriat (lit. Medal of Democracy). In fact, Beg is the only one in Pakistan, and yet the only four-star army general to have been decorated with such an honour. Although Prime Minister Benazir Bhutto was criticized for decorating a four-star general with a civilian award, she used to justify her decision, saying that Beg deserved this honour because he refrained from indulging in yet another military adventure like Zia and instead helped Pakistan to a peaceful transition of power through general elections.

On 16 August 1991, General Beg retired from his military serving, completing 41 years of service, and handing over command to General Asif Nawaz. As an army chief, General Beg is credited by an Australian Army expert for encouraging "wider thinking about tactics" within the Pakistan Army, particularly for establishing a much improved logistics chain and "contributed immensely to the army's warfighting capabilities".

Soviet withdrawal and Afghan war

As chief of army staff, Beg determinately retained the military's control over the policies regarding the national security of Pakistan, and dictated Prime Minister Benazir Bhutto's role in formulating the national security policies. Beg testified that the "real causes behind the 'Pressler amendment' was significant as long as Pakistan was considered an important entity of weakening Soviet Union's influence in South Asia". Various writers greatly questioned his idea of "strategic depth", which aim to transfer of Pakistan's military science command in dense Afghanistan, against the war with India.

Beg endorsed the role of his deputy, Lieutenant-General Hamid Gul in Afghanistan war who masterminded the Jalalabad operation which failed brutally; Gul was deposed by Prime Minister Bhutto soon after this action. Beg's role remained vital during and after the Soviet Union's troop withdrawal from Afghanistan and showed no intention to coordinate joint efforts with the U.S. to end the war in the country. In late 1989, Pakistan and U.S. propagated the message of departing of communist government in order to bring the clerical government instead. Authors and media reporters maintained that Beg controversially proposed an intelligence contingency plan between the agencies of Afghanistan, Pakistan and Iran that would grow into the "core of the Muslim world". Such idea was met with hostility in the government and Foreign Minister Yacob Khan and Prime Minister Benazir Bhutto were the ones who objected and opposed to this idea.

Gulf war in Iraq

In 1989, Beg drafted a contingency plan and organized a massive military exercise, Exercise Zarb-e-Momin, to prove the military solidarity contentions. One of the notable events as a stint as a chief of army staff during the end of Cold war took place in 1990, when Iraq invaded Kuwait amidst political tensions between two Arab countries. Beg fully endorsed the United States-led military campaign against Iraq. In a briefing given to Prime Minister Benazir Bhutto and President Ghulam Ishaq Khan, Beg maintained the assessment that once the ground battle with the Iraqi Army was joined, the Iraqi Army would comprehensively defeat and repel the American Army.

Ironically, Beg accused the Western countries for encouraging Iraq to invade Kuwait, though he kept his armed forces fighting against Iraq in support to Saudi Arabia. In 1990, he held state dinner for United States Central Command (SCENTCOM) commander General Norman Schwarzkopf where, together with Chairman Joint Chiefs Admiral Iftikhar Sirohey, brief the USCENTCOM on Pakistan Armed Forces battle preparations and military operational capabilities of Pakistan armed forces in Saudi contingent.

The Iraq war with Kuwait was a polarizing political issue in Pakistan and Beg carefully commanded and deployed the Pakistan Armed Forces' contingent forces during Operation Desert Storm in 1991. Beg calculated that the popular opinion would be in favor of Iraq, as the anti-American sentiment in the Middle East began to grow at that time.

But, neither did Beg's strategic prediction come true nor did he get an extension. Soon after the end of Gulf war, Beg proceeded towards his retirement on 18 August 1991.

Post-military career
After failing to persuade the government for his extension, Beg's later political ambitions forced then-president Ghulam Ishaq Khan to nominate General Asif Nawaz as the designated chief of army staff three months prior to his retirement. After Beg's retirement he continued the professorship at National Defence University in Islamabad, and remained active in country's political and military affairs.

Funding of conservative politicians

Soon after retiring from his military service in 1991, Beg earned the public criticism when the Pakistan Peoples Party's politicians went on aired on several news channels of being charged on personally authorizing the intelligence funds to be released to the conservative politicians. A lawsuit was filed by Asghar Khan at the Supreme Court of Pakistan against him, the former Director ISI Asad Durrani, and Younis Habib, the accountant with the Ministry of Defence in 1992, and official court inquiries began when the local Pakistani newspaper, alleging that the conservatives had received as much as ₨. 140 million to win over the "for-sale" leftists politicians.

In 1994, the official government investigations pursued further when Interior minister Naseerullah Babar in Benazir administration disclosed this matter at the Parliament while maintaining that "it was the ISI that had disbursed funds to purchase the loyalty of conservative mass and nationalist public figures to manipulate the general elections held in 1990 and to bring the conservatives in race to compete with left-wing politicians in the country." It was reported that Gen. Beg had the Younis Habib released and deposited around ₨. 140 million in the Survey Section 202 account of Military Intelligence (MI), with ₨. 6 million were channeled to accounts of President Ghulam Ishaq Khan including the bureaucracts: Refaqat Hussain, Roedad Khan, and Ijlal Zaidi. In 2017, the second lawsuit filed against Prime Minister Nawaz Sharif has connected him when Just. Gulzar, in his final verdict, reads:

Nuclear proliferation controversy
Internationally, Beg was widely criticised for his alleged involvement with the nuclear program of Iran. A report in The Friday Times contends that after taking over as Chief of Army Staff, General Aslam Beg began lobbying about "such cooperation with Iran" on nuclear technology as a part of his "strategy of defiance" of the United States. As chief of army staff, Beg had initiated lectureship programs on physics, chemistry, mathematics and engineering for inter-services officers, by the Pakistani scientists serving their professors, to have better understanding on nuclear policy matters and policy development.

Earlier, Beg had calculated that such cooperation with Iran was popular and that, Saudi Arabia and the Persian Gulf Arabs were less popular as American clients in the region. General Beg had encouraged dr. Abdul Qadeer Khan to proliferate technology to Iran and North Korea.

The speed with which he maintained the "new nuclear policy" leads one to speculate whether he simply wanted the "obstacle" of General Zia to disappear from the scene. General Zia did not know or received any payments of such agreement; in fact, Zia did not know if Beg was in act with Iran. Zia was deeply committed to the Arabs, especially to Saudi Arabia, to create a restraint to contain the Iranian influence. According to Ahmad, Prime minister Nawaz Sharif was shocked that Beg had signed a secret nuclear deal with Iran without telling him; therefore, the Prime minister abrogated the cooperation and tightened the security watch on A.Q. Khan. However, in 2004 interview to PBS, Beg clearly denied of his involvement with Iranian program and quoted:

In 2005 interview to NBC, Beg defended his and A.Q. Khan's ground and maintained to the NBC that "Nuclear Proliferators can't be stopped." Beg added that the Americans and Europeans have been engaged in nuclear proliferation as part of a concept, called "outsourcing nuclear capability", to friendly countries as a measure of defense against nuclear strike. Beg pointed out that the "nuclear non-proliferation regime, therefore, is dying its natural death at the hands of those who are the exponents of the nuclear non-proliferation regime". Beg also theorized that "nuclear deterrent is what holds the strategic balance between the two or more belligerents".

Accusation of role in Zia's death

According to an article in the Express Tribune, Beg was in contact with senior scientist, Dr. Abdul Qadeer Khan, about bringing Iran into the fold of "nuclear prowess" much to the annoyance of his superior and senior officer, General Muhammad Zia-ul-Haq. At this point, without a green signal from President Zia-ul-Haq, Beg got acquainted with Dr. A.Q. Khan to secretly proliferate the technology crucial to master the nuclear fuel.

On 1 December 2012, President Zia's son Ijaz-ul-Haq maintained that it was Beg who was conspired behind the death of his father. Earlier in 1988, the Shafiur Rehman Commission that was to establish the cause of the crash of Muhammad Zia-ul-Haq's plane concluded that because of Army's obstruction in the investigation, the real perpetrators behind the attack cannot be brought forward.

Political activism
Upon returning to civilian life, General Beg founded and established a policy think-tank institute in Islamabad, known as Foundation for Research on International Environment National Development and Security (Friends). He is the current founding chairman of the Friends think-tank since its foundations.

Beg later founded the nationalist political party, the Awami Qaiyadat Party (lit. National Leadership Party) which continued to be a part of right-wing sphere. Though his party gained no political prominence and failed to compete in national general elections; his party remains registered in Election Commission with Gun as its election symbol.

Musharraf on Beg
General Beg was one of many professor under whom Musharraf had studied at National Defence University. Musharraf had high regards for Beg as one of his "significant professor" in his university years, but after 11 September 2001, they became estranged. Beg was labelled as one of many professors at NDU who were called "pseudo-intellectuals", by Musharraf.

Awards and decorations

Foreign decorations

Literature

Books authored by Beg

Articles and works by Beg

Further reading

References

Bibliography
 Zahid Hussain. Frontline Pakistan: The Struggle with Militant Islam, New York: Columbia University Press, 2007.

External links
 Official profile at Pakistan Army website
Articles by Mirza Aslam Beg at Outlook India

|-

1931 births
Living people
Mughal nobility
People from Azamgarh district
Muhajir people
Baloch Regiment officers
Pakistan Military Academy alumni
National Defence University, Pakistan alumni
Special Services Group officers
People of the Bangladesh Liberation War
Academic staff of the National Defence University, Pakistan
Chiefs of Army Staff, Pakistan
Military government of Pakistan (1977–1988)
Pakistani democracy activists
Government of Benazir Bhutto staffers and personnel
Recipients of Nishan-e-Imtiaz
Recipients of Hilal-i-Imtiaz
Military leaders of the Gulf War
Foreign recipients of the Legion of Merit
Pakistan Command and Staff College alumni